Mynydd Mawr (Welsh for big mountain) is a mountain in Snowdonia, North Wales, approximately  west of Snowdon itself, overlooking Llyn Cwellyn and being the northern outlier of the Moel Hebog group.  A popular ascent starts from Rhyd Ddu. On its western flank are the remains of ancient settlements and  field systems. The profile of Mynydd Mawr from the north is often thought to resemble an elephant lying down, and consequently the mountain is often colloquially also called "Yr Eliffant" ('The Elephant'), or "Elephant Mountain" by non-Welsh speakers.

The summit offers extensive views, on a clear day to the west, the views extend to the Lleyn Peninsula and Caernarfon Bay, from the north-west includes Anglesey. To the north lies Moel Eilio and to the east is Moel Hebog and Snowdon. On exceptionally clear days, the Wicklow Mountains in Ireland can be seen westwards across the Irish Sea from the summit.

References

External links

 Walking guide and photographs here and here.
 www.geograph.co.uk : photos of Mynydd Mawr and surrounding area

Betws Garmon
Llandwrog
Llanllyfni
Mountains and hills of Gwynedd
Mountains and hills of Snowdonia
Sites of Special Scientific Interest in West Gwynedd
Hewitts of Wales
Marilyns of Wales
Nuttalls